County Road 13 did run between the village of Dragsvik in Sogndal Municipality and the village of Moskog in Sunnfjord Municipality in Vestland county, Norway.

County Road 13 and a short section of County Road 55 are designated as one of eighteen National Tourist Routes in Norway. The road crosses the Gaularfjellet mountains.

In 2019, the road was renumbered to County Road 613, as a part of a reform aiming to have separate numbers of National Roads and County Roads. After this only National Road 13 has number 13 in Norway.

Route
Sunnfjord municipality
  Moskog
 Jølstra (ca. 50 m)
 to Haukedalen
 Vallestad waterfall
 at the village of Vik
 Soget (ca. 60 m)
 Osen (ca. 60 m)
 to Hestad
 Closed going east of Mjell at night in winters

Sogndal municipality
Nystølen  Elevation:  (highest point on this road)
 Closed going north of Mel at night in winters
 to Menes
 Breiskreda Tunnel (180 m)
 Nautskreda Tunnel (180 m)
  to Tjugum and Balestrand
 at Dragsvik, connections to

References

013
013
National Tourist Routes in Norway
Sunnfjord
Sogndal